Korsun-Shevchenkivskyi Raion  was a raion (district) of Cherkasy Oblast, central Ukraine. Its administrative centre was located at the town of Korsun-Shevchenkivskyi. The raion covered an area of 896 square kilometres. The raion was abolished on 18 July 2020 as part of the administrative reform of Ukraine, which reduced the number of raions of Cherkasy Oblast to four. The area of Korsun-Shevchenkivskyi Raion was split between Cherkasy Raion and Zvenyhorodka Raion. The last estimate of the raion population was 

At the time of disestablishment, the raion consisted of four hromadas:
 Korsun-Shevchenkivskyi urban hromada with the administration in Korsun-Shevchenkivskyi, transferred to Cherkasy Raion;
 Nabutiv rural hromada with the administration in the selo of Nabutiv, transferred to Cherkasy Raion;
 Selishche rural hromada with the administration in the selo of Selishche, transferred to Zvenyhorodka Raion;
 Stebliv settlement hromada with the administration in the urban-type settlement of Stebliv, transferred to Zvenyhorodka Raion.

References

Former raions of Cherkasy Oblast
1923 establishments in Ukraine
Ukrainian raions abolished during the 2020 administrative reform